The Samad (also spelled Sammad) is a family of long-range UAVs of unidentified origin used in the Middle East. The Samad is available in three variants: The Samad-1, the Samad-2 (also known as "UAV-X"), and the Samad-3. The Samad family of UAVs is primarily used by the Houthi movement in the Yemeni civil war, where the drone's long range is used to strike targets in Saudi Arabia and the UAE.

Etymology
The UAV was named after Houthi leader Saleh al-Sammad, who was assassinated by the UAE in 2018.

Design 
The Samad is available in three models. All models have distinctive V-shaped tail fins and a pusher engine. Samad UAVs have a ventral protrusion and wing skids, which they use for takeoff and landing.

The Houthis say they have designed and manufactured the Samad family of drones. They say that the Samad 1 was designed in 2018 and the Samad Samad 2 and Samad 3 in 2019. Independent analysts say the Samad-2 is probably of Iranian origin.[needs better source] According to  James Rogers, of the Center for War Studies at the University of Southern Denmark, the Samad 3 is believed to be supplied by Iran.

The Samad-1 is the base variant. It has a wingspan of approximately 3.5 meters. It has a range of 500 km and is for surveillance.

The Samad-2 is 2.8 meters long and has a wingspan of 4.5 meters. It has distinctive V-shaped tail fins and is powered by a rear-mounted German or Chinese pusher-engine. It is also known as the "UAV-X", the provisional designation given to it in a UN report. The Samad-2 can carry either a reconnaissance or an explosive payload. The reconnaissance version carries a camera, a Nikon D810 digital camera in one model. The attack variant has a warhead of 18 kg of explosives mixed with ball bearings.

The Samad-3 is an "extended-range" version with a conformal fuel tank mounted on the top of the drone. The dimensions are estimated at 4.5m wingspan, like the Samad-2. According to the Houthis, it has a range of 1,500 km and carries an explosive payload. Qualitatively, the Samad-3 is described as "inexpensive, small, slow and clumsy" and unlikely to strike targets with good accuracy.

Operational history 

The Houthis have operated Samad UAVs since at least August 2018.

The Houthis say a Samad-3 UAV was used to attack Abu Dhabi international airport on 26 July 2018. Analysis by Jeremy Binnie of Jane's of footage released by the Houthis of the attack says it is consistent with a Samad-2 or Samad-3, or also a different drone, the Hudhud 1. The UAE denied there was any drone attack on the airport. Two other alleged claims on a drone attack on the airport were reported by the Houthis, as well as two attacks on Dubai International Airport, all which were denied and unverified. An investigation by Bellingcat, published months before video of the attack was released, said "It is highly likely that a Houthi-led drone attack did not take place in Abu Dhabi and Dubai".

The Houthi military spokesman said used Samad 3 drones, at the Abqaiq–Khurais attack on 14 September 2019.

Operators
  Hezbollah– Samad-1 (according to two bloggers, Stijn Mitzer and Joost Oliemans)
  – Samad-1, Samad-2, and Samad-3
  – IRGC, Samad-1 (according to the above bloggers.)

Specifications (Samad-2 / UAV-X)

References

External links 

Unmanned military aircraft